Jeroen Gies (born 23 January 1995) is a German-Dutch professional footballer who plays as a goalkeeper for Rotenburger SV.

References

External links
 Profile on FuPa.net

1995 births
German people of Dutch descent
People from Rotenburg (district)
Footballers from Lower Saxony
Living people
German footballers
Dutch footballers
Association football goalkeepers
SV Meppen players
1. FC Lokomotive Leipzig players
Rotenburger SV players
3. Liga players
Regionalliga players
Oberliga (football) players